David Kaufman is an American journalist who writes for several influential publications, including the Financial Times, The New York Times, Details, New York and some of the premiere international publications, including Time International.  He appears regularly on the Fox News business network.  He wrote the Wallpaper* guide to Tel Aviv that was published by Phaidon Press.  Kaufman's mother is Jewish and of European ancestry and his father was African-American.  He obtained his Bachelor of Arts in sociology and Near Eastern studies from Brandeis University and his Master's degree in journalism from New York University.  He lives in New York City and is openly gay.

References

External links 
New York magazine stories by David Kaufman
New York Times stories by David Kaufman
David Kaufmans blog Transracial.net

Year of birth missing (living people)
American newspaper reporters and correspondents
Living people
Brandeis University alumni
New York University alumni
Writers from New York City